The Bible was first translated into the Georgian language as early as the 5th century. The Vani Gospels (Vani Four Gospels; Georgian: ვანის ოთხთავი, Vanis otkhtavi) is an illuminated manuscript of the gospels in the Georgian Nuskhuri script dating from the end of the 12th–early 13th centuries. Recently a new translation was completed by the Institute for Bible Translation.

References

Georgian
Georgian language